Teddy Samuel Sharman-Lowe (born 30 March 2003) is an English footballer who plays as a goalkeeper for Havant & Waterlooville, on loan from Premier League club Chelsea.

Club career
Sharman-Lowe was released by Leicester City as a schoolboy prior to joining Burton Albion’s youth academy in 2017. In September 2020 it was confirmed that he had signed for Chelsea and would remain on loan with Burton for the entirety of the 2020–21 season. On 8 September 2020 he made his first-team debut in an EFL Trophy group match against Peterborough United and later that month played against Aston Villa in the EFL Cup. On 4 January 2021, Sharman-Lowe was recalled from his loan spell by his parent club, Chelsea. On 13 January 2023, Sharman-Lowe joined Havant & Waterlooville on loan for the remainder of the National League South season.

International career
In February 2020, Sharman-Lowe was selected by the England U-17 team and made two appearances at that level.

On 2 September 2021, Sharman-Lowe made his debut for the England U-19s during a 2-0 victory over Italy at St. George's Park.

On 17 June 2022, Sharman-Lowe was included in the England U-19 squad for the 2022 UEFA European Under-19 Championship. England won the tournament with a 3-1 extra time victory over Israel on 1 July 2022.

Career statistics

Club

Notes

Honours
England U19s

 UEFA European Under-19 Championship: 2022

References

2003 births
Living people
English footballers
England youth international footballers
Association football goalkeepers
Burton Albion F.C. players
Chelsea F.C. players
Havant & Waterlooville F.C. players